Hazel Hill Township is an inactive township in Johnson County, in the U.S. state of Missouri.

Hazel Hill Township was established in 1856, and named for the hazel bushes near a local schoolhouse.

References

Townships in Missouri
Townships in Johnson County, Missouri